The Alma Scots football program is a college football team that represents Alma College in the Michigan Intercollegiate Athletic Association, a part of the Division III (NCAA).  The team has had 30 head coaches since its first recorded football game in 1894. The current coach is Jason Couch, class of 1997. The former head coach is Greg Pscodna,  who replaced Jim Cole who had coached the Scots for a record 21 seasons, taking the position in 1991.

Key

Coaches
Statistics correct as of the end of the 2022 season.

Notes

References

Alma Scots

Michigan sports-related lists